Andrej Živković (born 21 August 1970) is a retired Croatian football midfielder.

Career
As a player, he spent most of his career playing with Rijeka, Orijent, Istra and Pomorac, either in the Croatian First Football League or the Croatian Second Football League. He became a manager following his retirement from professional football, managing several lower tier clubs around Rijeka.

References

External links

1970 births
Living people
Footballers from Rijeka
Association football midfielders
Croatian footballers
HNK Rijeka players
HNK Orijent players
NK Istra players
NK Pomorac 1921 players
NK Krk players
Croatian Football League players
First Football League (Croatia) players